Cornerstone United Methodist Church (Cornerstone UMC) is a church that started as a Bible Study mission of Taytay United Methodist Church in 1982 and was localized on March 5, 1995. The church is located at Neptune St. Santana Subdivision, Barangay Dolores, Taytay, Rizal in the Philippines.

Vision 
Cornerstone UMC is a growing church that (1) aims to win the lost and make them disciples; and (2) seeks to be united in faith, strong in fellowship, and stable in finances.

Mission 
Cornerstone UMC is committed to pray, to reach, to teach, to share and to care for others.

Affiliations

History 
In 1982, Taytay United Methodist Church opened a Bible Study group in the area composed of families supported by the church's Helping Hands Children's Project.  This Bible Study Group was handled by Rev. Alfonso Briones, Rev. Ruben Letana, and the then student pastors Rodel Palma, Ramir Tolentino, Ador Crisostomo, Alfred Policarpio, Alvin Villanueva, Rolando Mendoza and deaconess Dorie Garcia.  At that time, it was called Cornerstone Christian Fellowship. From 39 heads of families, Cornerstone Christian Fellowship soon increased in number.  Among the first families that became a part of this group were the Barela, Castro, Dujali, Uson, Gaila, Padayao, Lampon, and Mirandilla families.  The continuous growth soon paved the way for the first Worship Service to be held in 1988 at the Barela residence led by Pastor Ramir Tolentino. On June 14, 1989, Pastor Felimon Dela Cruz was assigned as the first pastor of the worshipping congregation. The worship services then were held at a makeshift chapel on a lot rented for 50 pesos per month.

The congregation continued to increase in number which prompted Taytay UMC to purchase a 500 sq.m. lot in the area. The ground breaking of the church construction was held in 1992. On March 5, 1995 the Annual Conference recognized her as a regular local church and was named Cornerstone United Methodist Church.

Currently, the church is doing mission work in Sitio Pipindan and Sitio Ticullo in Talim Island, Binangonan, Rizal.

List of Pastors and Deaconesses

Pastors

Deaconesses

List of Church Workers Produced

Pastors 
 Rev. Luzviminda Barela-Borst
 Rev. Eva Prado
 Ricardo Abangan
 Charie Gundan
 Rowena Duenos

Deaconess 
 Franly Castro

Church Council Members - Conference Year 2013-2014 

Methodism in Asia
Churches in Rizal